Allah Upanishad, or Allopanishad, is a book of brahmanical origin  written during Muslim rule in India during 16th to 17th century in the time of Mughal Emperor Akbar's reign.

Swami Dayananda Saraswati's book Satyarth Prakash (The Light of Truth) argues that the Allopanishad is not part of the Upanishad canon and it does not even appear in the Atharvaveda. The famous Muktikā canon, which was given by Rama to Hanuman as the list of authentic 108 Upanishads does not contain Allopanishad. Most scholars view that the book has been written during the Mughal era (possibly during Akbar's reign). Allopanishad describes Akbar as a messenger or prophet of God.

Full text
1) "I take refuge in our Allah [La, to perish, and alla, eternal] who protects Mitra [sun] and Varuna [the god of water]."

2) "There is but one God [Illelle]; the king, Varuna, again takes refuge (in him)."

3) "Everything is God; sun and stars."

4) "Everything is God; Varuna, the sun, the illuminator."

5) "The Great Breath, the Lord, is the Sacrificer. The Lord is the Sacrificer."

6) "Allah is the first and best, the highest; Omnipresent; Highest of all Gods."

7) "He is only One; ever remaining."

8) "By sacrifice is Allah to be propitiated."

9) "Allah is sun, moon and all stars."

10) "Allah is (the God) of Rishis and all other deities, and of Indra, the first Maya [primordial matter] and the ether."

11) "Allah is in the earth and in heaven and in multifarious forms."

12) "Everything is Allah. Everything is Allah and everything is He."

13) "Om is Allah. Everything is He. By nature eternal. Atharvan [the Rishi] bows down to such."

14) "Give us water, cattle, siddhis, and things that live in water, and Phut [a mantra]."

15) "The slayer of enemies. Hum, Hrim. Nothing but Allah; nothing but Allah. Thus ends the Allopanishad."

Views on authorship and authenticity

In an issue of The Theosophist, R. Ananthakrishna Sastri wrote that the work was written by "Pandits for monetary rewards" during the time of Muslim rule in India. He further remarked that the work was "not in the style of ordinary Upanishads" and its words "appear to sound more like Arabic". Bhattacharya and Sarkar categorize Allopanishad as an "Islamic Work" and write that it was written by a Hindu courtier of Akbar, as an "apocryphal chapter of the Atharvaveda". Charles Eliot suggested that the work may have been written in connection with the Din-i-Ilahi movement, and wrote that the work "can hardly be described as other than a forgery". Swami Vivekananda wrote that Allopanishad was evidently of a much later date and that he was told that it was written in the reign of Akbar to bring Hindus and Muslims together. Sadasivan writes that it was written by Brahmins for Akbar when he was experimenting with a new religion. Debendranath Tagore wrote in his autobiography that Allopanishad was composed in the days of Akbar with the objective of converting Hindus into Muslims. Bankim Chandra Chattopadhyay wrote that the Allopanishad was "the shameless production of some brahmin sycophant of Muslim rulers of India." Abraham Eraly states that the book was symbolic of the various cross-cultural pollination between Hindu and Muslim cultures during the time of the Mughals and was meant to bring the two communities together.

See also
Din-i-Ilahi
Upanishads

References

Hinduism and Islam
Upanishads